Michaela Guzy is a New York based American travel blogger and TV personality.

Work 
Guzy’s travels to places such as Kenya and Morocco have been featured on Bravo TV. Guzy is an advocate for sustainable living. She speaks at industry travel events, such as at TBEX, and has appeared on television networks across the country, such as WCBS in New York.

Her travels have been included in media outlets, such as Highways magazine.

Guzy is  an adjunct professor at New York University School of Professional Studies, where she teaches a course called, "Travel Storytelling: Creating Video Content".

Early life

Guzy was born in Missouri where she was raised before graduating from Spring Hill College.

References 

Living people
American businesspeople in mass media
New York University faculty
Year of birth missing (living people)